Paliga is a genus of moths of the family Crambidae erected by Frederic Moore in 1886.

Species
Paliga anpingialis (Strand, 1918)
Paliga celatalis (Walker, 1859)
Paliga damastesalis (Walker, 1859)
Paliga fuscicostalis C. Swinhoe, 1894
Paliga ignealis (Walker, 1866)
Paliga leerna fontanis (Carolo, 2016)
Paliga leucanalis C. Swinhoe, 1890
Paliga machoeralis (Walker, 1859)
Paliga quadrigalis (Hering, 1901)
Paliga rubicundalis Warren, 1896
Paliga schenklingi (Strand, 1918)

References

Pyraustinae
Crambidae genera
Taxa named by Frederic Moore